Shawn E. Okpebholo (born March 28, 1981) is an American composer and conductor.

Career
The music of Okpebholo has been performed in over twenty-five states, as well as Canada, Africa, Europe, and Asia at various distinguished venues and festivals, including the Monte Music Festival in Goa, India; the National Cathedral; MusicX Contemporary Music Festival; state music festivals of Indiana, Kentucky, Ohio and Texas; PRIZM Ensemble Concert Series; and The University of North Carolina at Greensboro New Music Festival where he was an invited special guest lecturer and composer. Other invited guest lecture appearances and masterclasses include the University of Benin (Nigeria) and Biola University Conservatory of Music, among others.

Okpebholo regularly receives commissions from noted soloists, universities, and organizations, including the Fifth House Ensemble, the International Tuba and Euphonium Association, the United States Air Force, the Ohio Music Education Association, to name a few. Some celebrated performing artists and ensembles include Cadillac Moon, Fulcrum Point, Picosa, United States Army Field Band, cellist Leonardo Altino, baritones Will Liverman and Robert Sims, mezzo-soprano J'Nai Bridges, pianists Paul Tuntland Sánchez and Mark Markham, euphonium virtuoso Steven Mead, flutists Caen-Thomason-Redus and Jenny Oh Brown, among others. He has received grants from the Illinois Arts Council, Tangemen Sacred Music Center, Wheaton College (Aldeen Research Grant, John Stott Faculty Grant in Human Needs and Global Resources, Faculty Global Research Grant), and a Union University Pew Research Grant. His compositions can be heard on a variety of commercially released albums, including his first album solely devoted to his music, Steal Away, a collection of re-imagined Negro spirituals.

As an academic, Okpebholo has been in residence at many colleges and universities in both the U.S. and Nigeria, giving masterclasses, guest lecturing, and having his music featured in concert. He was one of eighteen featured composers in Volume IV of the book series, "Composers on Composing for Band," edited by Mark Camphouse. Further, his composition and research interests have been a gateway for ethnomusicological fieldwork in both East and West Africa

Okpebholo is currently professor of music theory at Wheaton College Conservatory of Music.

Awards
 American Prize in Composition (orchestral division), "Kutimbua Kivumbi," Second Place, 2016
 Flute New Music Consortium Composition Competition, first prize
 Adams-Owens Composition Award, 
 Accent06 International Composition Competition, first place

Discography
 Lord, How Come Me Here?, 2022
 Steal Away, 2015

Notable students
 Elliot Leung

References

External links

1981 births
Living people
Place of birth missing (living people)
20th-century classical composers
21st-century classical composers
American music arrangers
Musicians from Lexington, Kentucky
Wheaton College (Illinois) faculty
University of Cincinnati – College-Conservatory of Music alumni
Asbury University alumni
21st-century American composers
Male classical composers
20th-century American composers
20th-century American male musicians
21st-century American male musicians